The Lisburn–Antrim line is a  railway line of Northern Ireland Railways. It has been closed to passenger services since 2003.

History
The line opened in 1871 as the Dublin and Antrim Junction Railway. The train service on the line was provided by the Ulster Railway until 1876, and by the Ulster Railway's successor the Great Northern Railway thereafter. In 1879 the D&A Junction ceased to be a separate company and was absorbed by the GNR.

Current status

The line is currently closed to passengers after all rail services were withdrawn from the line in June 2003.

Translink's reason for closing the line was that it was unable to maintain two routes to Antrim economically. Translink operated a skeleton service on the line, but then gave notice that it would be shut.

Speculation remains that the line could one day re-open under plans to operate a Belfast — Lisburn — Antrim — Belfast circular route, with the possibility of a station for Belfast International Airport which is close to the line at Aldergrove.

Translink's future plans include re-opening this line, allowing trains from Derry to run once per hour on an alternating pattern between Bleach Green and Knockmore.

In 2012, a section of railway embankment, weakened by weather near , gave way as a train was about to pass over. The driver managed to stop and reverse the train away without incident. The embankment has since been repaired.

On Monday 12 September 2016, the Democratic Unionist Party announced that they would propose a motion to re-open the line as part of an Airport Link. It could mean that services could resume on the line in the near future. It would likely mean that  would be replaced by the new  station at the site of the old SERC building a little further down the line.

On Sunday 10 November 2019, units 3002+3003 worked a radio test train over the NIR network, including the Lisburn to Antrim line with the stations Lisburn West, Ballinderry, Glenavy, Crumlin and Belfast International Airport being included.

In late 2022, Translink showed timelined plans for the 'Lisburn Area Renewals'. The work is set to start in October 2022 and last until Spring of 2024. Maps from Translink showed an 'Antrim Branch' is to receive new bi-directional railway signalling. This development is to be combined with plans for a Lisburn West Station.

Notes

Bibliography

External links
Translink - Northern Ireland Railways

Great Northern Railway (Ireland)
Closed railways in Northern Ireland
Transport in County Antrim
Lisburn
Antrim, County Antrim
Irish gauge railways